Harry Kenyon (born April 10, 1894) was a Negro leagues pitcher and manager for a few years before the founding of the first Negro National League, and in its first eight seasons.

Kenyon attended the Arkansas Baptist College in Little Rock, Arkansas.

References

External links
 and Baseball-Reference Black Baseball stats and Seamheads

Negro league baseball managers
Chicago American Giants players
Lincoln Giants players
Brooklyn Royal Giants players
Indianapolis ABCs players
Detroit Stars players
Memphis Red Sox players
Bacharach Giants players
Baseball players from Arkansas
People from Arkadelphia, Arkansas
1894 births
Year of death missing
Baseball pitchers
Hilldale Club players
Kansas City Monarchs players
Arkansas Baptist College alumni